Anyang East railway station is a railway station on the Beijing–Guangzhou–Shenzhen–Hong Kong high-speed railway that is located in Anyang, Henan, China. It opened with the Beijing–Zhengzhou section of the railway on 26 December 2012.

References

Railway stations in Henan
Stations on the Shijiazhuang–Wuhan High-Speed Railway
Railway stations in China opened in 2012